Purnima Banerjee (née Ganguly, 1911-1951) was an Indian anti-colonial nationalist and a member of the Constituent Assembly of India from 1946 to 1950.

Early life and career 
She was the younger sister of famous freedom fighter, educator and activist Aruna Asaf Ali. Their father Upendranath Ganguly was a restaurant owner who hailed from Barisal district of Eastern Bengal (now Bangladesh) but settled in United Provinces. Her mother Ambalika Devi was the daughter of renowned Brahmo scholar Trailokyanath Sanyal who wrote many Brahmo hymns. Upendranath Ganguly's younger brother Dhirendranath Ganguly (DG) was one of the earliest film directors. Another brother, Nagendranath, was a university professor who married Nobel Prize winner Rabindranath Tagore's only surviving daughter Mira Devi. As secretary of the Indian National Congress committee in Allahabad, she was responsible for engaging and organizing trade unions, kisan meetings and work towards greater rural engagement. She took part in the Salt March and the Quit India Movement and was subsequently imprisoned. Later, she became a member of the Uttar Pradesh Legislative Assembly and of the Constituent Assembly of India.

Death 
Suffering from ill-health, she died prematurely in Nainital in 1951, a few years after the independence.

References 

Indian independence activists from Uttar Pradesh
Prisoners and detainees of British India
Bengali politicians
Indian National Congress politicians from Uttar Pradesh
Members of the Constituent Assembly of India
1911 births
1951 deaths
Brahmos
Politicians from Allahabad